Kamishiiba Dam is a dam in Miyazaki Prefecture, Japan. It was Japan's first arch dam and required significant sacrifices to build.

Dams in Miyazaki Prefecture
Dams completed in 1938